The Colombian clawed gecko (Pseudogonatodes furvus) is a species of lizard in the family Sphaerodactylidae. It is endemic to the Magdalena, Colombia.

References

Pseudogonatodes
Reptiles of Colombia
Endemic fauna of Colombia
Taxa named by Alexander Grant Ruthven
Reptiles described in 1915